A Dance of Moths is the third novel by Singapore-born writer Goh Poh Seng, first published in 1995 by Select Books. It tells the story of two Chinese Singaporean, one a creative designer of an advertising firm and the other an accounts clerk.

Plot synopsis
Divided into three parts and set in Singapore, the dual protagonists are followed through in the novel in alternate chapters. Ong Kian Teck is a creative designer of an advertising firm who has an extra-marital affair and faces estrangement from his wife. Chan Kok Leong is an accounts clerk who tries to free himself from the drudgery of his job. The latter lives in a small HDB flat in Toa Payoh, and has a retarded sister whom his mother dutifully brings up. The connection between the two men are not made clear until the very last chapter of the book.

References

1995 novels
Singaporean novels
Novels set in Singapore